Alix Raynaud (born 28 October 1974) is a French executive producer and line producer.

Early life
In 1998, Raynaud is graduated from business school ESCP Europe of Paris.

Filmography
 Read My Lips (Sur mes lèvres) (2001) (producer)
 Love Street (Rue des plaisirs) (2002) (line producer)
 A Prophet (Un prophète (2009) (co-producer)
 Rust and Bone (De Rouille et d'Os) (2012) (co-producer)

Awards
 BAFTA Award - Best Film Not in the English Language for A Prophet.

References

External links
 

1974 births
French film producers
French women writers
Living people
Place of birth missing (living people)